The Asia Pacific Journal of Management Research and Innovation is a double blind peer reviewed academic journal that carries theoretical and empirical papers, case studies, research notes, executive experience sharing and review articles, and it is a forum for different domain areas of management, information technology and related disciplines.

The journal is published four times a year by SAGE Publications (New Delhi) in collaboration with the Asia Pacific Institute of Management.

This journal is a member of the Committee on Publication Ethics (COPE).

Abstracting and indexing 
Asia Pacific Journal of Management Research and Innovation is abstracted and indexed in:
 DeepDyve
 J-Gate

External links 
 
 Homepage

References 

 http://publicationethics.org/members/asia-pacific-journal-management-research-and-innovation

SAGE Publishing academic journals
Publications established in 2012
Business and management journals